Hideaway Pizza is a restaurant originally opened in 1957 in Stillwater, Oklahoma. Its original location is in Stillwater at the corner of 3rd St and Knoblock, near the Oklahoma State University campus.

In 1993, the restaurant started opening locations outside of Stillwater. As of June 2020, there are eight locations in the Oklahoma City area, seven locations in the Tulsa area, one location in Bartlesville, Oklahoma, and three locations in Arkansas.

Hideaway Pizza sells pizza, salads, pastas, and sandwiches.

VW Bug Delivery
During the 1960s and 1970s and through the 1980s, Hideaway was known for having delivered pizzas to consumers in Stillwater using a fleet of brightly colored Volkswagen Beetles.  In the late 1990s, when Volkswagen re-released the Beetle, Hideaway received the first one sold in Oklahoma.

References

Restaurants in Oklahoma
Pizzerias in the United States
Restaurants established in 1957
1957 establishments in Oklahoma
Companies based in Tulsa, Oklahoma
Restaurant chains in the United States